Kokõ is a village in Rõuge Parish, Võru County in Estonia.

Gallery

References

Villages in Võru County